The 1999 Kogi State gubernatorial election occurred in Nigeria on January 9, 1999. The APP nominee Abubakar Audu won the election, defeating the PDP candidate.

Abubakar Audu emerged APP candidate.

Electoral system
The Governor of Kogi State is elected using the plurality voting system.

Primary election

APP primary
The APP primary election was won by Abubakar Audu.

Results
The total number of registered voters in the state was 1,265,442. Total number of votes cast was 974,892 while number of valid votes was 961,206. Rejected votes were 13,686.

References 

Kogi State gubernatorial elections
Kogi State gubernatorial election
Kogi State gubernatorial election
Kogi State gubernatorial election